The Sullivan Model K-3 Crested Harpy is a three place light sport aircraft of the 1920s.

Design
The Crested Harpy was a low wing monoplane, with an enclosed cabin which could accommodate a pilot and two passengers.  It had conventional landing gear, and was powered by a Kinner K-5. The fuselage is constructed of welded steel tubing with aircraft fabric covering. The Wichita-assembled aircraft featured soundproofing materials.

Specifications (K-3 Crested Harpy)

See also

References

External links
Image of a K-5 Crested Harpy
Airwar.ru - Sullivan K-3 Crested Harpy (in Russian)

1920s United States civil utility aircraft
Low-wing aircraft
Single-engined tractor aircraft